Armand Mestral (born Armand Serge Zelikson; 25 November 1917 - 17 September 2000) was a French actor and singer. He appeared in more than seventy films from 1945 to 1992.

Filmography

References

External links 

1917 births
2000 deaths
French male film actors